Brendan Wood Ryan (born March 26, 1982) is an American former professional baseball infielder. He played 10 seasons in Major League Baseball (MLB) for the St. Louis Cardinals, Seattle Mariners, New York Yankees and Los Angeles Angels.

Ryan was a shortstop but was a versatile enough defender that he made professional appearances at every position but catcher. The 2012 winner of the Fielding Bible Award, Ryan had a reputation as one of the best defensive players in baseball.

Early and personal life
Ryan was born in Los Angeles on March 26, 1982, to Katie and Jim Ryan.  He is the youngest of their four children. Ryan attended Notre Dame High School in Sherman Oaks, California. His father was an infielder for Loyola Marymount University and holds the school's single-season record for the most hits with a wooden bat. One of his uncles, Willie Ryan, was a National Champion First Team All-American first baseman for the USC Trojans baseball team; his other uncle, Dr. Patrick Ryan, was a college sprinter at UCLA and Michigan State.

College career
In the fall of 2000, Ryan enrolled at Lewis–Clark State College to play college baseball in the National Association of Intercollegiate Athletics. In his first season, he batted .375 with 5 triples, the third most ever by a Warrior. As a sophomore shortstop, he hit .359 with 34 RBIs and hit .378 with runners on. During the 2002 season, he hit safely in 18 straight games.  Beyond his solid offensive numbers, Ryan gained a reputation as a good defensive infielder.

In the 2002 summer season, Brendan played collegiate summer baseball for the Alaska Goldpanners of Fairbanks in the Alaska Baseball League.

Professional career
In 2003, Ryan entered the MLB amateur draft and was selected in the seventh round (215th overall) by the St. Louis Cardinals.

Ryan hit .311 for the Cardinals' rookie league affiliate, the New Jersey Cardinals, in 2003.  In 2004, he was promoted to the Cardinals' Class A affiliate, the Peoria Chiefs.  With a .322 batting average and 30 steals in the 2004 season, another promotion came for Ryan, this time to the High A Class team, the Palm Beach Cardinals, where Ryan was selected as a Florida State League All-Star.  He was promoted again during the middle of 2005 season to the Class AA Springfield Cardinals.

In 2006, Ryan suffered a wrist injury in spring training limiting him to 28 games spread among four stops in the minors.  That same year, Ryan appeared in 28 games for the Peoria Saguaros in the Arizona Fall League and batted .310 (39-for-126) with two home runs, 19 runs and 20 RBI.  His 39 hits were tied for tops for the 2006 AFL season.  He collected two four-hit games and hit safely in his first eight AFL games (.425 BA) and 10 of his first 11 (.396).

St. Louis Cardinals

Ryan was originally called up on and made his major league debut for the Cardinals on June 2, 2007, against the Houston Astros. He was later sent down on July 27, 2007, but was recalled on August 12, 2007, and remained with the Cardinals for the rest of the season.  In his rookie year, he hit for a .289 batting average with 4 home runs and 11 runs batted in. Ryan also scored 29 runs and recorded 7 stolen bases without being caught stealing. He batted significantly better against left-handed pitching in his first season with a batting average of .354, as opposed to his .232 average against right-handers.  His first major league home run was a game-winner in the top of the 11th inning off of Scott Schoeneweis of the New York Mets on June 26, 2007. His second home run also came rather dramatically, as he contributed to a four run comeback on July 4, 2007 when the Cardinals were at one point behind 4–1. The Cardinals won the game 5–4 against the Arizona Diamondbacks.

Ryan opened the 2008 season on the 15-day disabled list with a right oblique strain suffered in spring training.  He rehabbed injury in the minor leagues in the first month of the season until called up on April 23.  He was the Cardinals' primary utility infielder for the most of the season, although he played three games in the outfield. He was optioned to Memphis on August 6 and recalled again on September 2.

Ryan started the 2009 season in St. Louis.  He went on the 15-day disabled from April 30 through May 15 with a left hamstring strain, making a rehab stint in Memphis.  By June, he moved up to be the everyday shortstop, batting over .300 and playing spectacular defense.  On August 20, 2009, in the second inning of the Cardinals and Padres Game, Ryan hit his first career grand slam off of San Diego pitcher Tim Stauffer. On September 19, 2009, Ryan hit a walk off single off Chicago Cubs closer Carlos Mármol. Ryan also had a home run in the 2–1 win. His game-winning single was the first walk-off hit of his career.

By the end of the 2009 regular season, Ryan's defense at shortstop had been recognized as a major factor in the Cardinals' divisional title.  However, in February 2010, he underwent a procedure to debride dead tissue from his right wrist performed by Dr. Steven Shin in Los Angeles. The start to his 2010 spring training debut was delayed due to the surgery. He made his 2010 Grapefruit League debut on March 20, but he showed no lingering effects.

Seattle Mariners
On December 12, 2010, Ryan was traded to the Seattle Mariners for Maikel Cleto.  

On July 26, 2011, Ryan broke up CC Sabathia's bid for a perfect game with a base hit with one out in the seventh inning.

On August 2, 2011, during a game against the Oakland Athletics, alert play by Ryan led to the unusual result of his reaching third on an infield hit. Ryan hit a ground ball fielded by Oakland shortstop Eric Sogard, but Sogard was left off-balance and his throw to first was late. Behind the back of Oakland first baseman Conor Jackson, Ryan ran for second which was left uncovered by Sogard, and then immediately for third as that base was also uncovered. While referred to in the media as an "infield triple", the play was officially scored as a single and fielder's choice.

In 2011, Ryan finished second for the second straight year in the voting for the Fielding Bible Award.

On April 21, 2012, Ryan was the final out of Philip Humber's perfect game. He was called for a swinging third strike on a checked swing, though the ball was not caught cleanly. Rather than running to first base, Ryan momentarily argued umpire Brian Runge's decision that he had swung, allowing catcher A. J. Pierzynski to throw the ball to first base for the final out. On June 8, he entered as a defensive replacement in the ninth inning of the Mariners' combined no-hitter against the Los Angeles Dodgers and made one of the game's closest putouts by throwing Dee Gordon out at first base. On August 15 of that same year, he scored the game's only run in the third inning of teammate Félix Hernández's perfect game, the Mariners defeating the Tampa Bay Rays.

In 2012, he won a Fielding Bible Award as the best fielding shortstop in MLB. In 2013, Ryan was replaced as the starting shortstop by Brad Miller mid-season, as Ryan had been hitting around the Mendoza Line.

New York Yankees

On September 10, 2013, Ryan was traded to the New York Yankees for a player to be named later. On November 18, 2013, he agreed to a new contract with the New York Yankees, and on November 27, 2013, he finalized a deal worth $5 million over two years. His deal also includes a club option for $2 million, and a player option for $1 million, for the 2016 season.

Ryan opened the 2014 season on the 15-day disabled list with back issues. As of May 2, 2014, he was on the 15-day disabled list with cervical spine nerve damage and was playing rehab games at AA Trenton. Ryan played only 49 games in 2014, batting .167 with 8 RBI.

Ryan began the 2015 season on the 15-day disabled list due to a right calf strain. On August 25, 2015, Ryan made his MLB pitching debut in the eighth inning against the Houston Astros, throwing two scoreless innings.

Ryan exercised his $1 million player option for the 2016 season.

Chicago Cubs

On December 17, 2015, the Yankees officially announced that Ryan had been the player to be named later in their trade with the Chicago Cubs for shortstop Starlin Castro. He was released by the Cubs on December 23, 2015.

Washington Nationals

On February 2, 2016, the Washington Nationals signed Ryan to a minor league contract with an invitation to spring training. He did not make the team, but accepted an assignment to the Syracuse Chiefs of the Class AAA International League.

Los Angeles Angels

Following an injury to Andrelton Simmons, Ryan was traded to the Los Angeles Angels of Anaheim, in exchange for cash considerations and a player to be named later, on May 10, 2016. He was designated for assignment on May 28, but was called back up on June 1.

Detroit Tigers
On December 19, 2016, Ryan signed a minor league deal with the Detroit Tigers, worth $625,000, which included an invite to spring training. He elected free agency on November 6, 2017.

Personal life
Ryan is married and has two children. They reside in Miracle Mile, Los Angeles.

References

External links

 stlcardinals.scout.com – Ryan player profile page at Scout.com

1982 births
Living people
Baseball players from Los Angeles
Notre Dame High School (Sherman Oaks, California) alumni
Major League Baseball shortstops
St. Louis Cardinals players
Seattle Mariners players
New York Yankees players
Los Angeles Angels players
Lewis–Clark State Warriors baseball players
New Jersey Cardinals players
Peoria Chiefs players
Palm Beach Cardinals players
Springfield Cardinals players
State College Spikes players
Memphis Redbirds players
Peoria Saguaros players
Tampa Yankees players
Trenton Thunder players
Scranton/Wilkes-Barre RailRiders players
Syracuse Chiefs players
Toledo Mud Hens players
Salt Lake Bees players
Alaska Goldpanners of Fairbanks players